is an upper secondary school in Kagoshima City, Kagoshima Prefecture, Japan. It is a co-educational public school.

Overvew
Those schools became Tsurumaru High School in 1949.

This high school's name is derived from Kagoshima Castle also called Tsurumaru Castle. People named the successor of Daiichi-Kagoshima Middle School "Tsurumaru" after the site of the Seventh Higher School because they missed it. The school emblem features a crane spreading its wings because  means a crane in Japanese. 

Kagoshima Prefectural Konan High School is the rival school.

Notable alumni

Politics and Government
Shigenori Tōgō - diplomat, Minister of Foreign Affairs, Minister of Colonial Affairs
Kokichi Shimoinaba - Superintendent General of Japanese police, member of the National Diet, Minister of Justice
Hiroko Ōta - economist, Minister of State for Economic and Fiscal Policy
Minoru Yanagida - member of the National Diet, Minister of Justice
Yasuhiro Ozato - member of the National Diet
Takashi Uto - member of the National Diet
Naokuni Nomura - admiral, Minister of Navy
Mitsuru Ushijima - general
Masafumi Arima - admiral
Academic
Hiroshi Enatsu - theoretical physicist, Professor Emeritus at Ritsumeikan University
Culture
Kawataro Nakajima - literary critic, Chairman of Mystery Writers of Japan, Professor Emeritus at Wayo Women's University, Mystery Writers of Japan Award, 
wowaka - musician

Surrounding area
Kagoshima-Chūō Station
Amu Plaza Kagoshima and Amuran Ferris wheel

Kagoshima Arena

Notes

References

External links

Kagoshima Prefectural Tsurumaru High School (Japanese)

High schools in Kagoshima Prefecture
Educational institutions established in 1894
Education in Kagoshima Prefecture
1894 establishments in Japan
Buildings and structures in Japan destroyed during World War II
Buildings and structures in Kagoshima